A suckling pig is a piglet fed on its mother's milk (i.e., a piglet which is still a "suckling"). In culinary contexts, a suckling pig is slaughtered between the ages of two and six weeks. It is traditionally cooked whole, often roasted, in various cuisines. It is usually prepared for special occasions and gatherings. The most popular preparation can be found in Spain and Portugal under the name lechón (Spanish) or leitão (Portuguese).

The meat from suckling pig is pale and tender and the cooked skin is crisp and can be used for pork rinds. The texture of the meat can be somewhat gelatinous due to the amount of collagen in a young pig.

History
There are many ancient recipes for suckling pig from Roman and Chinese cuisine. Since the pig is one of the first animals domesticated by human beings for slaughter, many references to pigs are found in human culture. The suckling pig, specifically, appears in early texts such as the sixth-century Salic law. As an example of a law governing the punishment for theft, Title 2, article 1, is, in Latin, . "If someone has stolen a suckling pig and this is proven against him, the guilty party will be sentenced to 120 denarii which adds up to three solidi (Latin coins)." These glosses in Frankish, the so-called Malbergse Glossen, are considered the earliest attested words in Old Dutch.

Controversy

It has been argued that the use of pigs for human consumption is unethical, especially in the case of young animals removed from their mothers earlier than weaning would happen in nature: natural weaning takes place at around 12 weeks of age, whereas suckling pigs are slaughtered at 2 to 6 weeks of age. Further, investigations by media and animal rights groups have uncovered animal cruelty and inhumane conditions related to the farming of suckling pigs. The sows, mother pigs, are in many countries kept in gestation crates or farrowing crates, which render them nearly immobile and unable to interact with their newborn offspring.

Regional dishes
There are various preparations for suckling pig in Western and Asian cuisines.

Latin countries

Lechón (Spanish, ; from leche "milk" + -ón) or leitão (Portuguese; from leite "milk" + -ão) is a pork dish in several regions of the world, most specifically in Spain (in particular Segovia), Portugal (in particular Bairrada) and regions worldwide previously colonized by the Portuguese Empire or Spanish Empire. Lechón/Leitão is a word referring to a roasted baby pig (piglet) which was still fed by suckling its mother's milk (a suckling pig). Lechón/Leitão is a popular item in the cuisine in Los Angeles (in the United States), Spain, Cuba, Puerto Rico, Honduras, Argentina, Uruguay, Bolivia, Ecuador, Peru, Costa Rica, the Dominican Republic, and other Spanish-speaking nations in Latin America, as well as in Portugal, Cape Verde, Angola, Mozambique and other Portuguese-speaking nations. It is also present as cochon de lait in the French-Swiss and French cuisines (in particular in Metz), in Italy (in particular in Sardinian cuisine as su porcheddu) and Romania. The dish features a whole roasted suckling pig cooked over charcoal. It has been described as a national dish of Cuba, Puerto Rico, Spain, Portugal, as well as the Philippines whose pig-roasting traditions (similar to other Austronesian regions) have native pre-colonial origins. In the latter case, the meaning of the designation diverted in these regions from the original Spanish term to become a general term for "roasted pig", and is nowadays used in reference to adult roasted pigs more often than to lechones (milk suckling pigs), with Cebu being asserted by American chef Anthony Bourdain as having the best pigs.

In most of these regions, lechón/leitão is prepared throughout the year for special occasions, during festivals. It is the centerpiece of the tradition Cuban Christmas feast La Noche Buena. After seasoning, the piglet is cooked by skewering the entire animal, entrails removed, on a large stick and cooking it in a pit filled with charcoal. The piglet is placed over the charcoal, and the stick or rod it is attached to is turned in a rotisserie action.

Puerto Rico

The dish has been described as a national dish of Puerto Rico. The name of the dish in Puerto Rico is lechón asado. It is a traditional dish served at festivals and holidays.

Colombia

Lechona, also known as lechón asado, is a popular Colombian dish. 

It is similar in style to many preparations made in other South American countries, consisting of a roasted pig stuffed with yellow peas, green onion, yellow rice and spices, cooked in an outdoor brick oven for several hours. 

It is mostly traditional to the Tolima Department in central Colombia and is usually accompanied by arepas, a corn-based dough.

Philippines

In most regions of the Philippines, lechón (spelled lechon without diacritic but also litson or lichon) is traditionally prepared throughout the year for special occasions, festivals, and the holidays. Although it acquired the Spanish name, Philippine lechon has pre-Hispanic origins as pigs are one of the native domesticated animals of all Austronesian cultures and were carried throughout the Austronesian Expansion all the way to Polynesia. In the former Spanish colony of the Philippines,  is considered a national dish. As the usage of the term has evolved over the years,  has now come to refer to roasted pig in general (including suckling pigs).

The native name of lechón is inihaw [na baboy] in Tagalog, a general term meaning "charcoal-roasted/barbecued [pig]". Native names were also preserved in other regions until recently, like in Cebu where it was previously more commonly known as inasal until Tagalog influence changed it to lechon in the 2000s. As the usage of the Spanish loanword evolved over the years in the languages of the Philippines, "lechon" has come to refer to roasted pig in general (including suckling pigs). Roasted suckling pigs are now referred to in the Philippines as "lechon de leche" (which in Spanish would be a linguistic redundancy, though corresponding to the term cochinillo in Spain).

It is a national dish of the Philippines. There are two major methods of preparing lechon in the Philippines, the "Manila lechon" (or "Luzon lechon"), and the "Cebu lechon" (or "Visayas lechon"). 

Visayan lechon is prepared stuffed with herbs which usually include scallions, bay leaves, black peppercorn, garlic, salt, and distinctively tanglad (lemongrass) or leaves from native Citrus trees or tamarind trees, among other spices. A variant among Hiligaynon people also stuffs the pig with the sour fruits of batuan or binukaw (Garcinia binucao). It is usually cooked over charcoal made from coconut husks. Since it is already flavored with spices, it is served with minimal dipping sauces, like salt and vinegar or silimansi (soy sauce, calamansi, and labuyo chili).

Luzon lechon on the other hand, is typically not stuffed with herbs. When it is, it is usually just salt and pepper. Instead, the distinctiveness of Manila lechon comes from the liver-based sauce, known as the "lechon sauce". Lechon sauce is made from vinegar, brown sugar, salt, pepper, mashed liver (or liver spread), breadcrumbs, garlic and onion. Manila lechon is also typically cooked over woodfire.

Most lechon can either be cooked based on the two main versions, or mix techniques from both. Both variants also rub salt or spices unto the skin to make it crispier, as well as continually baste the lechon as it cooks. Sometimes carbonated drinks may also be used. They are cooked on a bamboo spit over charcoal for a few hours with constant (traditionally manual) turning.  The pig is roasted on all sides for several hours until done.  The process of cooking and basting usually results in making the pork skin crisp and is a distinctive feature of the dish.

Leftover parts from the lechon, such as the head and feet, are usually cooked into another popular dish, lechon paksiw. Like lechon itself, lechon paksiw also differs based on whether it is prepared Luzon-style or Visayas-style, with the former using liver sauce as an essential ingredient, while the latter does not. In some cases, these parts or stale lechon can be repurposed into another dish, such as Sisig.

Remainder of Asia (other than the Philippines)

There is also variant of suckling pig among the Indonesian non-Muslim ethnic groups, such as the Balinese, Batak, and Minahasa. Some pork dishes (e.g. in Singapore) are also influenced by ethnic Chinese. In Southeast Asia, roast suckling pig is eaten in Chinese or Vietnamese restaurants for important parties. It is also a popular dish at wedding dinners or a party for a baby's completion of its first month of life.

Non-Latin Europe

The European cuisines of Austria, Croatia, Georgia, Germany, Macedonia, the Netherlands, Russia, Serbia, Slovenia, Switzerland and Sweden favor the dish highly as well. It accompanies goose as the traditional Christmas feast of families in Russia and Serbia, while the Russian Navy maintains a tradition of presenting a roast piglet (or several) to the crew of a ship returning from deployment.

Suckling pig is known in German, Austrian and German-Swiss cuisines as Spanferkel and in the Dutch cuisine as speenvarken. It can be roasted in the oven or grilled, and is often served at festive occasions such as Oktoberfest.

In Sweden suckling pig is called spädgris, it is usually cooked in the oven, or sometimes roasted directly over the fire. It is often stuffed with various fruits such as apples and plums, together with butter and breadcrumbs.

United States
The suckling pig is used in Cajun cuisine in the southern U.S., where the Cochon de Lait Festival is held annually in the small town of Mansura, Louisiana. During this festival, as its name implies, suckling pigs are roasted. Other uses for the suckling pig in the U.S. include slow roasting in an oven or (as in a Hawaiian-style pig roast) in a pit. The latter remains popular in the cuisine of the Southern United States.

See also
 Asado
 Eisbein
 
 Roasted pig
 Kalua
 List of barbecue dishes
 List of spit-roasted foods
 Lechon kawali
 Lechon manok
 Inihaw
 Pavochon
 Pig pickin'
 Siu yuk

Footnotes

External links

The Historical Lechón
Philippines Swine Meat Domestic Consumption by Year
Livestock: Inventory

References

 

Pig farming
Pork
Food and drink festivals
Louisiana cuisine
Spit-cooked foods
German cuisine
Pork dishes
Barbecue
Colombian cuisine
Cuban cuisine
Ecuadorian cuisine
Philippine cuisine
Puerto Rican cuisine
Dominican Republic cuisine
Spanish cuisine
Cantonese cuisine
Hong Kong cuisine
Holiday foods
Christmas food
Balinese cuisine
Polynesian cuisine
Malagasy cuisine
Stuffed dishes
Baked goods
National dishes
Spanish pork dishes
Latin American pork dishes